Robin Courteney Nedwell (27 September 1946 – 1 February 1999) was an English actor. He is best remembered for his role as Duncan Waring in the television comedy series Doctor in the House and its sequels; he also featured in other television series such as The Lovers, The Upchat Connection, The Climber and the ATV comedy-drama Shillingbury Tales.

Biography
He was born in Bournville, Birmingham, West Midlands, England but moved with his family at an early age to Cardiff, Wales, where he was educated at Monkton House prep school. After leaving school he studied at University College, Cardiff and joined local theatre company, Everyman Theatre Cardiff, and then trained at the Central School of Speech and Drama studying Stage Acting.

Soon after finishing drama school he landed the role of Duncan Waring in the hugely popular British television comedy series Doctor in the House (1969–70). The producer, Humphrey Barclay, talking about Nedwell's audition said "his natural personality and sense of comedy were immediately apparent and we cast him on the spot", and recalled his trademark "huge laugh". Taking a break from the series in 1971, Nedwell returned in a leading role as Dr. Waring in the sequels Doctor in Charge, Doctor at Sea, Doctor on the Go, Doctor Down Under (filmed in Australia), and Doctor at the Top. Most of his roles were designed for television, and apart from the "Doctor" series, his appearances included Vault of Horror (1973) – along with his "Doctor" co-star Geoffrey Davies – Stand Up, Virgin Soldiers (1977), The Shillingbury Blowers (1980), The Zany Adventures of Robin Hood (1984) and Cluedo (1990).

Nedwell became known later in his career for his performances on stage. He appeared in the West End in Brigadoon in 1989, and in 1992, played Max Detweiler in a British tour of The Sound of Music, a production that was also staged at Sadler's Wells. He performed with the Royal Shakespeare Company during the 1995–1996 season, appearing in that year's productions of The Taming of the Shrew (Grumio), Richard III and Ben Jonson's comedy The Devil is an Ass.

Personal life
Nedwell had a romance with co-star Diane Keen. In 1982, Nedwell married PR agent Heather Inglis, with whom he had a daughter although the couple later separated. He had a brother, Dr. Jeremy Nedwell.

Death

Nedwell lived in Hedge End, Hampshire, England and died at his doctor's surgery in Hedge End after suffering a heart attack on 1 February 1999, aged 52.

Filmography
 The Vault of Horror (1973) – Tom (segment 4 "Bargain in Death")
 Stand Up, Virgin Soldiers (1977) – Lt. Grainger
 The Shillingbury Blowers (1980) – Peter Higgins
 A Slice of Life (1983) – Toby
 The Zany Adventures of Robin Hood (1984) – Will Scarlett

References

External links

Robin Nedwell – TV Comedy People
Robin Nedwell – BBC Guide to Comedy
Robin Nedwell – Famous alumni of Canton High School (Cardiff)

1946 births
1999 deaths
Alumni of the Royal Central School of Speech and Drama
British male comedians
British male film actors
British male stage actors
British male television actors
People from Birmingham, West Midlands
20th-century English male actors
Male actors from Cardiff
20th-century British comedians
People from the Borough of Eastleigh